East Rockingham High School is located in Elkton, Virginia and is part of Rockingham County Public Schools and opened in August 2010. It relieved a severe overcrowding problem at Spotswood High School, which currently houses around 950 students. East Rockingham competes athletically in the VHSL Group A Bull Run District and Region B. The Principal is Marc Sweigart. The Assistant Princpals are Barbara Eanes and Brandy Strickler. The school's mascot is the Eagle and their school colors are red and black. The main rival of East Rockingham is Page County.

References

Public high schools in Virginia
Schools in Rockingham County, Virginia
Educational institutions established in 2010
2010 establishments in Virginia